Dominique Daquin (born 10 November 1972 in Martinique) is a French volleyball player, who won the bronze medal with the France men's national volleyball team at the 2002 World Championship. Standing at 1.97 m, he plays as a middle-blocker.

Individual awards
 2001 European Championship "Best Blocker"

References
 FIVB Profile

1972 births
Living people
Martiniquais men's volleyball players
Volleyball players at the 2004 Summer Olympics
Olympic volleyball players of France
French people of Martiniquais descent
French men's volleyball players